Alawmapru Min (Arakanese:အလောမဖြူ; was the founder of the Launggyet Dynasty of Arakan who reigned from 1250 to 1256.

Early life 

The future king was born to Prince Nganalon and Princess Saw Shwe Nan of Second Parein Dynasty in the year 1227 CE. 

He was born with albinism which the chronicles reporting the baby prince
look pure whittish skin and his hair all grayed.

Reign 

Death of Nganalon, his father and he succeeded him and was determined to 
moved the capital to Launggyet which was permanently established in 1251 CE (613 ME). 

His queen was Saw Thit-Shwe (စောသစ်ရွှေ), he died after reigning for 6 years and succeeded by son, Razathugyi in 1256.

Bibliography

References 

1256 deaths
13th-century Burmese monarchs 
Monarchs of Launggyet
1227 births